The 2019 College Football All-America Team includes those players of American college football who have been honored by various selector organizations as the best players at their respective positions.  The selector organizations award the "All-America" honor annually following the conclusion of the fall college football season.  The original All-America team was the 1889 College Football All-America Team selected by Caspar Whitney and Walter Camp. The National Collegiate Athletic Bureau, which is the National Collegiate Athletic Association's (NCAA) service bureau, compiled, in the 1950, the first list of All-Americans including first-team selections on teams created for a national audience that received national circulation with the intent of recognizing selections made from viewpoints that were nationwide.  Since 1957, College Sports Information Directors of America (CoSIDA) has bestowed Academic All-American recognition on male and female athletes in Divisions I, II, and III of the NCAA as well as National Association of Intercollegiate Athletics athletes, including all NCAA championship sports.

The 2019 College Football All-America Team is composed of the following College Football All-American first teams chosen by the following selector organizations: Associated Press (AP), Football Writers Association of America (FWAA), American Football Coaches Association (AFCA), Walter Camp Foundation (WCFF), Sporting News (TSN, from its historic name of The Sporting News), Sports Illustrated (SI), The Athletic (Athletic), USA Today (USAT) ESPN, CBS Sports (CBS), College Football News (CFN), Scout.com, Athlon Sports, and Fox Sports (FOX).

Currently, the NCAA compiles consensus all-America teams in the sports of Division I FBS football and Division I men's basketball using a point system computed from All-America teams named by coaches associations or media sources.  Players are chosen against other players playing at their position only.  To be selected a consensus All-American, players must be chosen to the first team on at least two of the five official selectors as recognized by the NCAA.  Second- and third-team honors are used to break ties.  Players named first-team by all five selectors are deemed unanimous All-Americans. Currently, the NCAA recognizes All-Americans selected by the AP, AFCA, FWAA, TSN, and the WCFF to determine consensus and unanimous All-Americans.

Twenty-five players were recognized as consensus All-Americans for 2019, 16 of them unanimously. Unanimous selections are followed by an asterisk (*)

Offense

Quarterback
Joe Burrow, LSU (AFCA, AP, Athletic, Athlon, CBS, ESPN, FWAA, Phil Steele, SI, TSN,  USAT, WCFF)

Running back
J. K. Dobbins, Ohio State (Athletic, Athlon, CBS, Phil Steele, SI, USAT)
Travis Etienne, Clemson (USAT)
Chuba Hubbard, Oklahoma State (AFCA, AP, CBS, ESPN, FWAA, Phil Steele, SI, TSN, WCFF)
Jonathan Taylor, Wisconsin (AFCA, AP, Athletic, Athlon, ESPN, FWAA, Phil Steele, SI, TSN, WCFF)

Wide receiver
Ja'Marr Chase, LSU (AFCA, AP, Athletic, Athlon, CBS, ESPN, FWAA, Phil Steele, SI, TSN, USAT, WCFF)
Jerry Jeudy, Alabama (AFCA)
CeeDee Lamb, Oklahoma (AP, Athletic, Athlon, CBS, ESPN, FWAA, Phil Steele, SI, TSN,  USAT, WCFF)
DeVonta Smith, Alabama (Athlon)

Tight end
Harrison Bryant, FAU (AFCA, AP, Athlon, CBS, ESPN, FWAA, Phil Steele, SI, TSN,  USAT, WCFF)
Hunter Bryant, Washington (Athletic)

Offensive line
Tyler Biadasz, Wisconsin (AFCA, AP, Athletic, Athlon, CBS, ESPN, FWAA, Phil Steele, SI, TSN,  USAT, WCFF)
Wyatt Davis, Ohio State (AP, Athletic, Athlon, CBS, ESPN, TSN, USAT)
Kevin Dotson, Louisiana (AP, SI, USAT)
Alex Leatherwood, Alabama (AFCA)
Shane Lemieux, Oregon (SI)
Damien Lewis, LSU (Athletic)
Penei Sewell, Oregon (AFCA, AP, Athletic, Athlon, CBS, ESPN, FWAA, Phil Steele, SI,  TSN,  USAT, WCFF)
John Simpson, Clemson (AFCA, FWAA, Phil Steele, TSN,  WCFF, ESPN)
Andrew Thomas, Georgia (AFCA, AP, Athlon, CBS, ESPN, FWAA, Phil Steele, SI, TSN, WCFF)
Jedrick Wills, Alabama (Athletic, Athlon, CBS, USAT)
Tristan Wirfs, Iowa (FWAA, Phil Steele, WCFF)

Defense

Defensive line
Bradlee Anae, Utah (AFCA, ESPN, FWAA, Phil Steele, SI, USAT, TSN, WCFF)
Derrick Brown, Auburn (AFCA, AP, Athletic, Athlon, CBS, ESPN, FWAA, Phil Steele, SI, TSN, USAT, WCFF)
A. J. Epenesa, Iowa (Athletic)
Javon Kinlaw, South Carolina (AP)
James Lynch, Baylor (AFCA, AP, Athletic, Athlon, CBS, ESPN, FWAA, Phil Steele, TSN, USAT, WCFF)
Quincy Roche, Temple (SI)
Curtis Weaver, Boise State (Athlon, CBS, WCFF)
Chase Young, Ohio State (AFCA, AP, Athletic, Athlon, CBS, ESPN, FWAA,  Phil Steele, SI, TSN, USAT, WCFF)

Linebacker
Zack Baun, Wisconsin (FWAA, Phil Steele, WCFF)
Jonathan Greenard, Florida (CBS)
Micah Parsons, Penn State (AFCA, AP, Athlon, ESPN, SI, USAT)
Hamilcar Rashed Jr., Oregon State (Athletic, Phil Steele, SI)
Isaiah Simmons, Clemson (AFCA, AP, Athletic, Athlon, CBS, ESPN, FWAA, Phil Steele, SI, USAT, TSN, WCFF)
Curtis Weaver, Boise State (TSN)
Evan Weaver, California (AFCA, AP, Athletic, Athlon, CBS, ESPN, FWAA, Phil Steele, TSN, USAT, WCFF)

Defensive back
Julian Blackmon, Utah (Athletic, SI)
Grant Delpit, LSU (AFCA, CBS, TSN, WCFF)
Xavier McKinney, Alabama (Athlon, ESPN, USAT)
Jeff Okudah, Ohio State (AFCA, AP, Athletic, Athlon, CBS, ESPN, FWAA,  Phil Steele, SI, TSN, USAT, WCFF)
Amik Robertson, Louisiana Tech (FWAA, Phil Steele)
J. R. Reed, Georgia (AP, FWAA, Phil Steele, WCFF)
Derek Stingley Jr., LSU (AFCA, AP, Athletic, Athlon, CBS, ESPN, SI, TSN, USAT)
Antoine Winfield Jr., Minnesota (AFCA, AP, Athletic, Athlon, CBS, ESPN, FWAA, Phil Steele, SI, TSN, USAT, WCFF)

Special teams

Kicker
Rodrigo Blankenship, Georgia (AFCA, SI, USAT, WCFF)
Gabe Brkic, Oklahoma (CBS)
Keith Duncan, Iowa (AP, Athletic, Athlon, Phil Steele, TSN, FWAA)
Nick Sciba, Wake Forest (ESPN)

Punter
Max Duffy, Kentucky (AFCA, AP, Athletic, Athlon, ESPN, FWAA, Phil Steele, TSN, USAT, WCFF)
Braden Mann, Texas A&M (CBS, SI)

All-purpose / return specialist
Lynn Bowden, Kentucky (AFCA, AP, Athletic, Athlon, CBS, ESPN, Phil Steele, SI, TSN, USAT)
J. K. Dobbins, Ohio State (FWAA)
Joe Reed, Virginia (Athlon, CBS, FWAA, Phil Steele, WCFF)
Jaylen Waddle, Alabama (Athlon, CBS, FWAA, Phil Steele, SI, TSN, USAT)
Steven Wirtel, Iowa State (Phil Steele)
Joshua Youngblood, Kansas State (ESPN)

See also
 2019 All-ACC football team
 2019 All-Big Ten Conference football team
 2019 All-Big 12 Conference football team
 2019 All-Pac-12 Conference football team
 2019 All-SEC football team
 2019 All-AAC football team
 2019 All-Conference USA football team
 2019 All-MAC football team
 2019 All-Mountain West football team
 2019 All-Sun Belt football team

Footnotes

References
AFCA All-America Team
AP All-America teams
Athlon Sports All-America Team
CBS Sports All-America Team
ESPN All-America Team
Phil Steele All-America Team
FWAA All-America Team
Sports Illustrated All-America Team
The Athletic All-America Team
USA Today All-America Team
Walter Camp All-America Team
Sporting News All-America Team

All-America Team
College Football All-America Teams